Statistics of the V-League in the 1992 season.

First stage
18 participants divided into 2 groups playing single round robin;
top-4 of both to second stage

Known result:
Saigon Port 3-0 Hanoi Police

Note: Saigon Port did not reach second stage

Second stage

8 participants playing double round robin; top-4 to semifinals

Winners: Quang Nam (Da Nang)

References
1992 V-League at RSSSF

Vietnamese Super League seasons
1
Viet
Viet